Dǒng (Cantonese: Tung/Tong) is a surname of Chinese origin. DONG is from a Chinese character that also means ‘to supervise’ or ‘to manage’. The story goes that in the 23rd Century BC, an adviser to the emperor Shun was given this surname due to his ability to supervise and train dragons. In 2019, it was the 35th most common surname in Mainland China, shared by 6,770,000 people or 0.510% of the population.

Origin
Dǒng origins from:

Zhu Rong (祝融) of Ji (己) family get surname Dong (董) on territory of Chu (state).
Dongfu (董父) was descendant of ruler Shuan (叔安) in Chifeng, he married a daughter of Emperor Yao, use surname Dong (董). 
during the Zhou Dynasty, someone of government public official get surname Dong with Public Office name.
during the Ming Dynasty, the Ming Government give the surname Dong (董) to the leader of the Jurchen.

People
People with the surname Dong (董) include:

Historical Figures
 Dong Feng (physician) (董奉), Eastern Han physician
 Dong Qiao (董橋), writer
 Dong Qichang  (董其昌), Ming Dynasty painter, scholar, calligrapher, and art theorist
 Dong Yuan (董源), painter
 Dong Zhen (董贞), singer-songwriter
 Dong Zhongshu (董仲舒), Han Dynasty scholar
 Dong Zhuo (董卓), Warlord of the Han Dynasty 
 Dong Yi General of the Qin Dynasty
 Dong Fuxiang (董福祥), Qing dynasty General

Modern Figures
 Dong Biwu (董必武),  Former President of the People's Republic of China
Tung Chee Hwa (董建華; Dong Jianhua), first Chief Executive of Hong Kong
Dong Dong (董栋), trampoline gymnast, olympic gold medalist
 Dong Fangzhuo (董方卓), football striker
 Dong Fuxiang (董福祥), Qing dynasty general
 Dong Huling  (董虎岭), taijiquan teacher
 Dong Jie (董洁), Chinese actress and dancer
 Dong Sicheng (董思成; stage name, Winwin member of Korean boygroup NCT and Chinese boygroup WayV)
 Tung Chao Yung (董浩雲; Dong Haoyun), shipping magnate
 Tung Soo Hua (董素华; Dong Suhua), Singaporean television news presenter
 Tung Hsiang-lung (董翔龍), Commander of the Republic of China Navy (2011–2013)
 Tung Kuo-yu (董國猷), Deputy Minister of Foreign Affairs of the Republic of China (2011–2013)
 Tung Ying-chieh (董英杰; Dong Yingjie), taijiquan teacher
 Han Dong (董晗鵬; Dong Hanpeng), Chinese Canadian politician
 Joanna Dong (董姿彦; Dong Zhiyan), Singaporean songwriter

See also
List of common Chinese surnames

References

Đổng Trọng Thư (Dong Zhongshu). Vietnamese version
Đồng Đệ Chu (Vietnamese version) and Tong Dizhou (English version). Cri.cn website.

Vietnamese-language surnames
Chinese-language surnames
Individual Chinese surnames